Bretagne (D655) is an Aquitaine-class frigate of the French Navy. The Aquitaine class were developed from the FREMM multipurpose frigate program.

Development and design 
In November 2005 France announced a contract of €3.5 billion for development and the first eight hulls, with options for nine more costing €2.95 billion split over two tranches (totaling 17).

Following the cancellation of the third and fourth of the s in 2005 on budget grounds, requirements for an air-defence derivative of the FREMM called FREDA were placed – with DCNS coming up with several proposals. Expectations were that the last two ships of the 17 FREMM planned would be built to FREDA specifications; however, by 2008 the plan was revised down to just 11 FREMM (9 ASW variants and 2 FREDA variants) at a cost of €8.75 billion (FY13, ~US$12 billion). The 11 ships would cost €670 million (~US$760m) each in FY2014, or €860m (~US$980m) including development costs. In 2015, the total number of ASW variants was further reduced to just six units, including Bretagne.

Construction and career 
Bretagne was developed as part of a joint Italian-French program known as FREMM, which was implemented to develop a new class of frigates for use by various European navies. Constructed from 2013 the frigate Bretagne was launched in September 2016 and commissioned in February 2019.

Unlike previous ASW variants of the FREMM class, Bretagne and her sister ship  are fitted with SYLVER A50 launch cells (instead of SYLVER A43) able to accommodate larger Aster-30 surface-to-air missiles. This provides both ships with a potentially enhanced area air defence capability, though both vessels still lacked the boosted variant of the Herakles multi-function radar (which was necessary to accommodate the full range of Aster 30) as well as a complementary fire control radar. 

In August 2022, Bretagne was despatched to escort the Russian cruiser Marshal Ustinov and the destroyer Vice-Admiral Kulakov during their transit through the Bay of Biscay following the deployment of the Russian vessels from their Northern Fleet bases on the Kola Peninsula to the Mediterranean.

References 

2016 ships
Aquitaine-class frigates
Ships built in France